Joseph Henry Goodrich (November 17, 1893 – January 19, 1972) was an American Negro league third baseman in the 1920s.

A native of San Antonio, Texas, Goodrich made his Negro leagues debut in 1923 with the Washington Potomacs. He played for Washington again in 1924, his final professional season. Goodrich died in Austin, Texas in 1972 at age 78.

References

External links
 and Baseball-Reference Black Baseball stats and Seamheads

1893 births
1972 deaths
Washington Potomacs players
20th-century African-American sportspeople
Baseball infielders